Waldmüller is a German surname. Notable people with the surname include:

Ferdinand Georg Waldmüller (1793–1865), Austrian painter
Hans Waldmüller (1912–1944), German soldier
Lizzi Waldmüller (1904–1945), Austrian actress and singer

German-language surnames
Occupational surnames